Otakar Motejl (10 September 1932; Prague – 9 May 2010; Brno) was a Czech lawyer and politician. He served as the first ombudsman of the Czech Republic from 2000 until his death in 2010. In 1998–2000 he served as the Minister of Justice.

Life
Motejl graduated from the Law Faculty of the Charles University of Prague in 1955, and then worked as a lawyer in Banská Bystrica, Kladno, and Prague. Between 1966 and 1968, he worked at the Law Institute of the Ministry of Justice, then became a judge of the Supreme Court in 1968.

On 18 December 2000, he was selected as ombudsman. In 2006, Motejl was elected into the Chamber of Deputies of the Czech Republic for six years.

He participated in the 2003 Czech presidential election when he sought the Social Democratic nomination. According to poll by STEM, he was the front-runner in the primaries but was defeated by Miloš Zeman and Jaroslav Bureš and came third.

References

Czechoslovak judges
Supreme Court of the Czech Republic judges
Ombudsmen in the Czech Republic
Charles University alumni
Justice ministers of the Czech Republic
Recipients of the Legion of Honour
Burials at Vyšehrad Cemetery
Politicians from Prague
1932 births
2010 deaths
Candidates in the 2003 Czech presidential election
Czech Social Democratic Party presidential candidates
Czech Social Democratic Party Government ministers
20th-century Czech judges